The Garden is a 2020 Icelandic film written and directed by Ragnar Bragason. It won the Edda Award for Best Film in 2020.

See also
 Cinema of Iceland

References

External links
 

2020 films
Films directed by Ragnar Bragason
2020s Icelandic-language films
Icelandic comedy-drama films